Simon Lowys or Laws of Liskeard, Cornwall, was a Member of Parliament for Liskeard in October 1383, 
November 1384, 1385, February 1388, September 1388, January 1390, 1393, January 1397, 1402, 1410, 1411, May 1413 and November 1414 and for Lostwithiel in 1391.

References

14th-century births
15th-century deaths
Members of the Parliament of England (pre-1707) for Liskeard
Members of the Parliament of England for Lostwithiel
English MPs October 1383
English MPs November 1384
English MPs 1385
English MPs February 1388
English MPs September 1388
English MPs January 1390
English MPs 1391
English MPs 1393
English MPs January 1397
English MPs 1402
English MPs 1410
English MPs 1411
English MPs May 1413
English MPs November 1414